La Sorcière may refer to:

 Satanism and Witchcraft, an 1862 book by Jules Michelet
 La Sorcière (film), a 1956 drama film directed by André Michel
 Belladonna of Sadness, a 1973 anime film
 The Witches' Sabbath, a 1988 drama film directed by Marco Bellocchio
 "La Sorcière", an episode of the animated television series Ciné si and animated film Princes et Princesses

See also
 Sorcière (privateer), French and British privateer ships that sailed during the Napoleonic Wars